Iain Cameron Conn (born 22 October 1962) is a British businessman. He was the  chief executive (CEO) of Centrica from 2015 to 2019.

Early life
Iain Cameron Conn was born in October 1962 in Edinburgh and grew up in Galashiels. The elder of two sons, his father died when Conn was 12. He graduated in 1985 from Imperial College London, where he studied chemical engineering and management.

Career
Conn served as chief executive downstream, of BP from 2007 until 2014 and was a main board director from 2004 to 2014. BP's Downstream division comprised all of BP's customer facing, manufacturing and supply businesses in over 70 countries mainly under the BP, Castrol and Aral brands.  In addition to leading Downstream, Conn also had group regional responsibility for Europe, Asia and Southern Africa. Previously he served as the group executive officer for strategic resources of BP from 2004 to 2007, responsible for most of BP's functions and regional co-ordination, and was chief executive of BP's petrochemical division from 2002 to 2004.  Conn spent 29 years at BP, with leadership roles in oil trading, marketing, refining and petrochemicals, and E&P.

From 1 January 2015 until 2020, Conn served as the CEO of Centrica, replacing Sam Laidlaw. In this role Conn had responsibility for Centrica and had been leading the repositioning of the company for the next phase both strategically and in response to the low oil and gas price environment. However, as he stepped down,  Centrica's share price had reached a historic low. The company is shifting its portfolio emphasis more towards the customer in the areas of energy supply, services, the connected home, distributed energy and power, and energy marketing and trading.,

Conn was a director of BP from 2004 to 2014, and Rolls-Royce Holdings from 2005 to 2014, latterly as senior independent director. He is a non-executive director of BT.

Conn is a member of the council of Imperial College, chairman of the advisory board of Imperial College Business School, and a member of the advisory board of the Centre for European Reform.  He is a trustee of the Movement to Work.  He is a member of the president's committee of the Confederation of British Industry.  Previously he was a member of the advisory boards of the Centre for China in the World Economy at Tsinghua University, and of the Schwarzman School at Tsinghua.

Conn is a fellow of Royal Academy of Engineering, the Royal Society of Edinburgh, the Institution of Chemical Engineers, and the City and Guilds of London Institute.

In 2018, Conn received a pay of £2.4 million which is a 44% increase from the income (£1.68 million) of 2017 despite Centrica losing 742,000 customers and terminating around 4000 employees.

In July 2019 Centrica announced Conn would be stepping down from his post and retire from the company's board in 2020. Conn told the Today programme it was "a natural time to hand over" as Centrica had reported a pre-tax loss of £446m in the six months to June.

References

External links
 Centrica board

1962 births
Living people
People educated at St. Mary's School, Melrose
People educated at Loretto School, Musselburgh
Alumni of Imperial College London
British chief executives in the energy industry
British corporate directors
British Telecom people
Directors of BP
Rolls-Royce people
Centrica people
Fellows of the Royal Academy of Engineering
People from Musselburgh